Union Station is a historic train station located at Lockport in Niagara County, New York. It was constructed in 1889, for the New York Central Railroad in the Romanesque style.  It was deactivated as a station in the 1940s and lay unused until 1967.  It was renovated and reopened as a restaurant in 1971.  The restaurant was gutted by fire in December 1974, rebuilt and again destroyed by fire in 1978.

It was listed on the National Register of Historic Places in 1977.

The current owner of the building and property is Mark Davidson. He has plans for a full restoration pending state grants.

Gallery

References

External links
Union Station - Lockport, NY - U.S. National Register of Historic Places on Waymarking.com

Railway stations in the United States opened in 1889
Railway stations on the National Register of Historic Places in New York (state)
Historic American Engineering Record in New York (state)
Lockport, New York
Railway stations in Niagara County, New York
Former New York Central Railroad stations
National Register of Historic Places in Niagara County, New York
1889 establishments in New York (state)
Former railway stations in New York (state)